Rainy Lake 17A is a First Nations reserve on Rainy Lake in northwestern Ontario. It is one of the reserves of the Naicatchewenin First Nation.

References

Anishinaabe reserves in Ontario
Communities in Rainy River District